Soungoutou Magassa (born 8 October 2003) is a French professional footballer who plays as a defensive midfielder and centre-back for Ligue 1 club Monaco.

Early life 
Soungoutou Magassa was born in Stains, Seine-Saint-Denis, playing football for several Francilian clubs before joining the Monaco academy in 2018.

Club career 
Magassa signed his first professional contract with Monaco in April 2021, choosing them over other high-profile clubs seeking to sign him, including Roma and Milan. He made his professional debut for Monaco on 2 January 2022, replacing Wissam Ben Yedder during a 3–1 Coupe de France away win over Quevilly-Rouen in the round of 32.

International career 
Of Malian descent, Soungoutou Magassa is eligible for both the French and Malian national teams.

Style of play 
Described as a box-to-box midfielder, Magassa is able to play both as a defensive midfielder and a centre-back. Good with both feet, he describes himself as a player good at winning the ball back and finding optimal passing options.

References

External links
Profile at the AS Monaco FC website

2003 births
Living people
French people of Malian descent
Black French sportspeople
French footballers
Association football midfielders
Footballers from Seine-Saint-Denis#

AS Monaco FC players
Championnat National 2 players